Robert Manning (22 October 1816 – 9 December 1897) was an Irish hydraulic engineer best known for creation of the Manning formula.

Manning was born in Normandy, France, the son of a soldier who had fought the previous year at the Battle of Waterloo. In 1826 he moved to Waterford, Ireland and in time worked as an accountant.

In 1846, during the year of the great famine, Manning was recruited into the Arterial Drainage Division of the Irish Office of Public Works. After working as a draughtsman for a while, he was appointed an assistant engineer to Samuel Roberts later that year. In 1848, he became district engineer, a position he held until 1855. As a district engineer, he read "Traité d'Hydraulique" by d'Aubisson des Voissons, after which he developed a great interest in hydraulics.

From 1855 to 1869, Manning was employed by the Marquis of Downshire, while he supervised the construction of the Dundrum Bay Harbour in Ireland and designed a water supply system for Belfast. After the Marquis’ death in 1869, Manning returned to the Irish Office of Public Works as assistant to the chief engineer. He became chief engineer himself in 1874, a position he held it until his retirement in 1891. In 1866 he was awarded the Telford Medal by the Institution of Civil Engineers for his paper "On… the flow of water off the ground in the Woodburn District near Carrickfergus".

He died at his Dublin home on 9 December 1897 and was buried at Mount Jerome Cemetery. He had married his second cousin Susanna Gibson in 1848, by whom he had seven surviving children, one of whom, William Manning, was also an engineer. His second daughter was the painter Mary Ruth Manning (1853-1930).

Manning Formula
Manning did not receive any education or formal training in fluid mechanics or engineering. His accounting background and pragmatism influenced his work and drove him to reduce problems to their simplest form. He compared and evaluated seven best known formulae of the time for the flow of water in a channel: Du Buat (1786), Eyelwein (1814), Weisbach (1845), St. Venant (1851), Neville (1860), Darcy and Bazin (1865), and Ganguillet and Kutter (1869). He calculated the velocity obtained from each formula for a given slope and for hydraulic radii varying from 0.25 m to 30 m. Then, for each condition, he found the mean value of the seven velocities and developed a formula that best fitted the data.

The first best-fit formula was the following:

He then simplified this formula to:

In 1885, Manning gave  the value of 2/3 and wrote his formula as follows:

In a letter to Flamant, Manning stated: "The reciprocal of C corresponds closely with that of n, as determined by Ganguillet and Kutter; both C and n being constant for the same channel."

On 4 December 1889, at the age of 73, Manning first proposed his formula to the Institution of Civil Engineers (Ireland). This formula saw the light in 1891, in a paper written by him entitled "On the flow of water in open channels and pipes," published in the Transactions of the Institution of Civil Engineers (Ireland).

Manning did not like his own equation for two reasons: First, it was difficult in those days to determine the cube root of a number and then square it to arrive at a number to the 2/3 power. In addition, the equation was dimensionally incorrect, and so to obtain dimensional correctness he developed the following equation:

However, in some late 19th century textbooks, the Manning formula was written as follows:

Through his "Handbook of Hydraulics," King (1918) led to the widespread use of the Manning formula as we know it today, as well as to the acceptance that the Manning's coefficient  should be the reciprocal of Kutter's .

In the United States,  is referred to as Manning's friction factor, or Manning's constant.

References

External links
History of the Manning Formula

1816 births
1897 deaths
Irish civil engineers